The year 2022 in Japanese music.

Debuting

Debuting groups
 &Team
 Classy
 ExWhyZ
 Golden Child
 Ive
 Kep1er
 Metamuse
 Ocha Norma
 Omega X
 OnlyOneOf
 STAYC
 TFN
 Travis Japan
 Verivery
 WEi
 XG

Debuting soloists
 Akari Akase
 Hanna Ishikawa
 Kang Daniel
 Kent Itō
 Onew
 SennaRin
 Yoshino Aoyama
 Yuki Yomichi

Returning from hiatus

Returning groups
 Doping Panda
 Mrs. Green Apple

Returning soloists

Events

Number-ones
 Oricon number-one albums
 Oricon number-one singles
 Hot 100 number-one singles

Awards
 64th Japan Record Awards
 2022 MTV Video Music Awards Japan

Albums released

January

February

March

April

May

June

July

August

September

October

November

December

Disbanding and retiring artists

Disbanding
 Empire
 Go to the Beds
 Predia
 HO6LA

Retiring

Going on hiatus
 Kiyoshi Hikawa
 Mary's Blood
 Hikaru Yaotome
 Yoshimotozaka46

References

2022 in Japanese music